Lake Chicot is a lake adjacent to the Mississippi River. The lake is located on the east side of Lake Village, Arkansas in Chicot County. It is not only the largest oxbow lake in North America, but the largest natural lake in Arkansas, formed 300 years ago by the meandering of the Mississippi River.

The name Chicot, French for "stumpy," refers to the many cypress stumps and trees along the lake banks.

The Arkansas Department of Parks and Tourism operates Lake Chicot State Park on the northern end of the lake, Chicot County also operates a county park on the eastern side of the lake across from Lake Village.  Located at the State Park are a bait shop, fish cleaning station, and pier. The bait shop also has boat rentals. At the state park visitors' center, there are cabins for rent and camping spots. There is also a wildlife museum, featuring creatures found in and around Lake Chicot.

Activities
Fishing

In 1968 the Arkansas Game and Fish Commission, U.S. Army Corps of Engineers, and Chicot County Rural Development Authority began to restore Lake Chicot to its original state. When the dam at Cornerly Bayou was destroyed in a flood in 1927, silt and mud came pouring into the southern end of the lake. The pollution of the southern part of the lake eventually killed off the bass population. The upper part of the lake was protected by a dam, so it remained clean and protected. The groups decided to drain the water off the polluted section of the lake to compress sediment on the bottom, and plant vegetation that would provide a stable environment for fish species. The southern part of Lake Chicot was restocked, and has become a flourishing ecosystem. Fish species that can be caught in the lake include: Bluegills, channel catfish, largemouth bass, hybrid striper bass, crappie, redear sunfish, and bream.

Boating

Lake Chicot State Park provides a very good marina for people to launch their boats. The park, which is located on the northern part of the lake, also provides boat rentals. If you do not own a boat, you can rent a 15-foot bass boat with a 9.9 HP motor. Fishing and Camping gear can easily be found at the State Park's store. A couple other popular boat launches include: Jack R. Rhodes Lake Front Park in downtown Lake Village and the Chicot County Park.

Lake Chicot State Park

There are 122 campsites and 14 cabins located in Lake Chicot State Park. They meet the needs of large gatherings with indoor pavilions. This park is positioned right in the path of the Mississippi Flyway, so it naturally provides an amazing bird watching opportunity. A fun activity to do at the park is hiking. The Delta Woodlands Trail is 1 mile long and classified as easy. It is surrounded by bottomland hardwoods, and squirrels love to play in the pecan trees around the trail. Birds and colorful flowers thrive throughout the bountiful area.

Physical geography 
In the 1820s the land around Lake Chicot(also known as "Old River Lake") began to be filled with American settlers. Cotton farms worked by slaves were very common in the land surrounding the lake. A cotton plantation, on the shores on Lake Chicot, was named Sunnyside Plantation. It was created in the 1830s, and became the home of an Italian immigrant colony. In the mid 1800s Chicot County's population was 9,234, and of that number 7,512 were slaves.

The biggest Civil War battle in Chicot County was fought on June 6, 1864 on the shores of Lake Chicot. In the Battle of Old River Lake, Union and Confederate soldiers engaged in battle on the southern shore of the lake. The Union eventually won the battle. By moving the Confederates out of the Mississippi River, travel became much safer and easier. This was considered one of Arkansas' final Civil War battles.

References

Chicot
Bodies of water of Chicot County, Arkansas
Chicot
Tourist attractions in Chicot County, Arkansas